Ryan James Adams (born 11 March 1993) is an English first-class cricketer. He is a right handed batsman. He made his first-class debut for Cardiff MCCU against Glamorgan.

References

External links

1993 births
Living people
English cricketers
Cardiff MCCU cricketers